An election to Galway City Council took place on 23 May 2014 as part of that year's Irish local elections. 18 councillors were elected from three electoral divisions by PR-STV voting for a five-year term of office, an increase of 3 seats when compared to 2009.

Twenty-four-year-old Mairéad Farrell, a niece of Mairéad Farrell who was shot dead by the SAS in Gibraltar in 1988, won a seat at the first attempt. She was joined on the Council by 2 other councillors as Sinn Féin won 3 seats. Their gains came chiefly at the expense of Labour who lost 3 fifths of their seats to return with just 2 councillors. While Fianna Fáil won the most votes the party did not make any gains in the election and returned just 3 councillors as in 2009. By contrast Fine Gael gained a seat to become the largest party. Independents were the big winners, topping the poll in all LEAs and increasing their existing numbers by 2 seats.

Results by party

Results by Electoral Area

Galway City Central

Galway City East

Galway City West

References

Changes since 2014
† Galway City West Independent Cllr Catherine Connolly was elected as a TD for Galway West at the Irish general election, 2016. Her sister and now Independent Cllr, Colette, was co-opted to fill the vacancy on 21 March 2016.
†† Galway City Central Sinn Féin Cllr Anna Marley resigned her seat on 15 August 2016 saying she found it challenging to balance family responsibility with her work as a public representative. On 13 October 2016 Mark Lohan was co-opted to fill the vacancy.

External links
 Official website

2014 Irish local elections
2014